Nicola Segato (born August 24, 1987) is an Italian footballer who plays as a midfielder for S.S.D. Pro Sesto.

Club career
On 24 October 2019 he was released from his contract with Lecco by mutual consent.

External links

References

1985 births
People from Marostica
Sportspeople from the Province of Vicenza
Living people
Italian footballers
Association football midfielders
Bassano Virtus 55 S.T. players
Venezia F.C. players
A.S.D. Sacilese Calcio players
Pordenone Calcio players
Calcio Padova players
Abano Calcio players
A.C. Gozzano players
Calcio Lecco 1912 players
S.S.D. Pro Sesto players
Serie C players
Serie D players
Footballers from Veneto